Witches of East End is an American television series loosely based on the book series of the same name by Melissa de la Cruz and developed by Maggie Friedman. In the United States, it premiered on Lifetime on October 6, 2013 and ended on October 5, 2014, with 23 episodes. Witches of East End follows the lives of a family of witches – Joanna Beauchamp (Julia Ormond) and her two grown-up daughters, Freya Beauchamp (Jenna Dewan Tatum) and Ingrid Beauchamp (Rachel Boston), as well as her sister Wendy Beauchamp (Mädchen Amick).

For its first season, Witches of East End aired on Sunday nights at 10:00 pm and averaged 1.67 million viewers. For its second season, the show moved up to the 9:00 pm timeslot on Sundays and averaged 1.13 million viewers. On November 4, 2014, Lifetime cancelled Witches of East End due to low ratings in the second season.

Series overview

Episodes

Season 1 (2013)

Season 2 (2014)

DVD releases

References

External links 
 
 

Episodes
Lists of American comedy-drama television series episodes
Lists of American fantasy television series episodes